Saronikos Football Club is a Greek football club, based in Aegina island.

The association was founded in 1930. In 2009, they promoted to Gamma Ethniki.

Aegina
1930 establishments in Greece
Football clubs in Attica
Association football clubs established in 1930